This article is about the demographic features of the population of Malawi, including population density, ethnicity, education level, health of the populace, economic status, religious affiliations and other aspects of the population.

Malawi derives its name from the Maravi, a Bantu people who came from the southern Congo about 600 years ago. On reaching the area north of Lake Malawi, the Maravi divided. One branch, the ancestors of the present-day Chewas, moved south to the west bank of the lake. The other, the ancestors of the Nyanjas, moved down the east bank to the southern part of the country.

By AD 1500, the two divisions of the tribe had established a kingdom stretching from north of the present-day city of Nkhotakota to the Zambezi River in the south, and from Lake Malawi in the east, to the Luangwa River in Zambia in the west.

Migrations and tribal conflicts precluded the formation of a cohesive Malawian society until the turn of the 20th century. In more recent years, ethnic and tribal distinctions have diminished. Regional distinctions and rivalries, however, persist. Despite some clear differences, no significant friction currently exists between tribal groups, and the concept of a Malawian nationality has begun to take hold. Predominantly a rural people, Malawians are generally conservative and traditionally nonviolent.

The Chewas constitute 90% of the population of the central region; the Nyanja tribe predominates in the south and the Tumbuka in the north. In addition, significant numbers of the Tongas live in the north; Ngonis—an offshoot of the Zulus who came from South Africa in the early 19th century—live in the lower northern and lower central regions; and the Yao, who are mostly Muslim, predominate in the Southern Region of the country and live in a wide band from Blantyre and Zomba north to Lake Malawi and east to the border with Mozambique. Bantus of other tribes came from Mozambique as refugees.

Population

The proportion of children below the age of 15 in 2010 was 45.8%, 51.1% was between 15 and 65 years of age, while 3.1% was 65 years or older.

Total and Percent Distribution of Population by Single Year of Age (Census 09.03.2018)

UN population projections
Numbers are in thousands. UN medium variant projections 
2015	17,522
2020	20,677
2025	24,212
2030	28,173
2035	32,667
2040	37,797
2045	43,521
2050	49,719

Vital statistics
Registration of vital events is in Malawi not complete. The website Our World in Data prepared the following estimates based on statistics from the Population Department of the United Nations.

Fertility and births
Total Fertility Rate (TFR) (Wanted Fertility Rate) and Crude Birth Rate (CBR):

Fertility data as of 2016 (DHS Program):

Other demographic statistics 
Demographic statistics according to the World Population Review in 2019.

One birth every 48 seconds	
One death every 4 minutes	
One net migrant every 65 minutes	
Net gain of one person every 59 seconds

The following demographic are from the CIA World Factbook unless otherwise indicated.

Population
20,794,353 (2022 est.)
19,842,560 (July 2018 est.)
19,196,246 (July 2017 est.)

Religions
Protestant 33.5% (includes Church of Central Africa Presbyterian 14.2%, Seventh Day Adventist/Baptist 9.4%, Pentecostal 7.6%, Anglican 2.3%), Roman Catholic 17.2%, other Christian 26.6%, Muslim 13.8%, traditionalist 1.1%, other 5.6%, none 2.1% (2018 est.)

Age structure

0-14 years: 45.87% (male 4,843,107/female 4,878,983)
15-24 years: 20.51% (male 2,151,417/female 2,195,939)
25-54 years: 27.96% (male 2,944,936/female 2,982,195)
55-64 years: 2.98% (male 303,803/female 328,092)
65 years and over: 2.68% (2020 est.) (male 249,219/female 318,938)

0-14 years: 46.17% (male 4,560,940 /female 4,600,184)
15-24 years: 20.58% (male 2,023,182 /female 2,059,765)
25-54 years: 27.57% (male 2,717,613 /female 2,752,983)
55-64 years: 3% (male 284,187 /female 310,393)
65 years and over: 2.69% (male 234,776 /female 298,537) (2018 est.)

Birth rate
27.94 births/1,000 population (2022 est.) Country comparison to the world: 38th
40.7 births/1,000 population (2018 est.) Country comparison to the world: 8th
41 births/1,000 population (2017 est.)

Death rate
4.58 deaths/1,000 population (2022 est.) Country comparison to the world: 206th
7.7 deaths/1,000 population (2018 est.) Country comparison to the world: 100th
7.9 deaths/1,000 population (2017 est.)

Total fertility rate
3.4 children born/woman (2022 est.) Country comparison to the world: 41st
4 children born/woman (2018 est.) Country comparison to the world: 9th

Population growth rate
2.34% (2022 est.) Country comparison to the world: 31st
3.31% (2018 est.) Country comparison to the world: 3rd
3.31% (2017 est.)

Median age
total: 16.8 years. Country comparison to the world: 221st
male: 16.7 years
female: 16.9 years (2020 est.)

total: 16.6 years. Country comparison to the world: 223rd
male: 16.5 years 
female: 16.8 years (2018 est.)

Mother's mean age at first birth
18.9 years (2015/16 est.)
note: median age at first birth among women 25-29

Contraceptive prevalence rate
59.2% (2015/16)

Net migration rate
0 migrant(s)/1,000 population (2022 est.) Country comparison to the world: 91st
0 migrants/1,000 population (2017). There is an increasing flow of Zimbabweans into South Africa and Botswana in search of better economic opportunities.

Dependency ratios
total dependency ratio: 91 (2015 est.)
youth dependency ratio: 85.3 (2015 est.)
elderly dependency ratio: 5.7 (2015 est.)
potential support ratio: 17.4 (2015 est.)

Urbanization
urban population: 18% of total population (2022)
rate of urbanization: 4.41% annual rate of change (2020-25 est.)

urban population: 16.9% of total population (2018)
rate of urbanization: 4.19% annual rate of change (2015-20 est.)

Life expectancy at birth
total population: 72.44 years. Country comparison to the world: 154th
male: 69.33 years
female: 75.59 years (2022 est.)

total population: 62.2 years (2018 est.)
male: 60.2 years (2018 est.)
female: 64.3 years (2018 est.)

 total population: 61.7 years
 male: 59.7 years
 female: 63.8  years (2017 est.)

Sex ratio
 at birth: 1.03 male(s)/female
 under 15 years: 1 male(s)/female
 15-64 years: 0.97 male(s)/female
 65 years and over: 0.69 male(s)/female
 total population: 0.97 male(s)/female (2000 est.)

Ratio of medical doctors to general population
1 Doctor/65,000 Malawians

Major infectious diseases
degree of risk: very high (2020)
food or waterborne diseases: bacterial and protozoal diarrhea, hepatitis A, and typhoid fever
vectorborne diseases: malaria and dengue fever
water contact diseases: schistosomiasis
animal contact diseases: rabies

note: on 21 March 2022, the US Centers for Disease Control and Prevention (CDC) issued a Travel Alert for polio in Africa; Malawi is currently considered a high risk to travelers for circulating vaccine-derived polioviruses (cVDPV); vaccine-derived poliovirus (VDPV) is a strain of the weakened poliovirus that was initially included in oral polio vaccine (OPV) and that has changed over time and behaves more like the wild or naturally occurring virus; this means it can be spread more easily to people who are unvaccinated against polio and who come in contact with the stool or respiratory secretions, such as from a sneeze, of an “infected” person who received oral polio vaccine; the CDC recommends that before any international travel, anyone unvaccinated, incompletely vaccinated, or with an unknown polio vaccination status should complete the routine polio vaccine series; before travel to any high-risk destination, CDC recommends that adults who previously completed the full, routine polio vaccine series receive a single, lifetime booster dose of polio vaccine

Nationality
 noun: Malawian(s)
 adjective: Malawian

Ethnic groups

Chewa 34.3%
 Lomwe 18.8%
 Yao 13.2%
 Ngoni 10.4%
 Tumbuka 9.2%
 Sena 3.8%
 Mang'anja 3.2%
 Tonga 1.8%
 Nyanja 1.8%
 Nyakyusa 1%
 Europeans 0.04%
Other 2.5%

Languages

English (official)
Chichewa (official) - 6,500,000
Chiyao - 1,760,000
Chitumbuka - 1,180,000
Chilomwe - 2,290,000
Chingoni - 37,500
Chimakhuwa - 200,000
Chisena - 468,000
Chitonga - 271,000
Chinyika - 5,000
Chinyiha - 10,000
Chindali - 70,000
Chinyakyusa - 149,000
Chilambya - 59,500
Afrikaans - 26,000

Education expenditures
2.9% of GDP (2020)
country comparison to the world: 159

Literacy

definition: age 15 and over can read and write
 total population: 62.1%
 male: 69.8%
 female: 55.2% (2015 est.)

School life expectancy (primary to tertiary education)
total: 11 years (2011)
male: 11 years (2011)
female: 11 years (2011)

Unemployment, youth ages 15-24
total: 8.5%
male: 6.7%
female: 10.6% (2017 est.)

White Malawians
There has been reported a 7,400 white population. White Malawians are primarily of English and Scottish ancestry, however there are small numbers who are of Dutch, French, Italian, Greek, Spanish, Portuguese, Middle Eastern, Belgian, Scandinavian, or German background. White Malawians live in Lilongwe, Dedza, Dowa, Blantyre, Kasungu, Mchinji, Nkhotakota, Ntcheu, Ntchisi, Salima, Chitipa, Karonga, Likoma, Mzimba, Nkhata Bay, Rumphi, Balaka, Chikwawa, Chiradzulu, Machinga, Mangochi, Mulanje, Mwanza, Nsanje, Thyolo, Phalombe, Zomba, and Mzuzu.

See also
 Malawi
 Malawian American

References

 
Society of Malawi